Michael Del Priore (1954–May 26, 2020, born in Columbia, SC) was an American master portrait artist with an international reputation, known for oil and pastel portraits in the Classical Realism style.

Notability 
Del Priore was recognized as "one of America's top portrait artists". A master of the alla prima approach made famous by John Singer Sargent, he achieved many singular accomplishments, among them, painting subjects in the public sector.

Del Priore lived in Fork Shoals, in upstate South Carolina, however, he garnered international acclaim in his 40+ year career by doing over 850 oil portraits that included Members of Congress, Supreme Court Justices, Governors, clergy, educators, physicians, cultural, corporate, and community leaders. 24 of his works are listed in the National Portrait Gallery Catalog of American Portraits.

Official portraits 
Del Priore's notable portraits include President Ronald Reagan, Microsoft CEO Bill Gates and former Speaker of the House, Representative John Boehner. Thirteen of his portraits are in the art collection of the U. S. House of Representatives, the largest number by a single artist in U. S. history, ten are displayed in the South Carolina Statehouse art collection. He painted portraits for eight of South Carolina's Governors: Strom Thurmond, Ernest F. "Fritz" Hollings, Donald S. Russell, Robert Evander McNair, James B. Edwards, Richard Riley, Carroll A. Campbell Jr., and David Beasley. Among his portraits displayed in the South Carolina Statehouse, three in the Senate Chamber, are acclaimed Senators: Edward E. Saleeby, John Drummond, and John W. Matthews, Jr. Two of his paintings in the House Chamber are of former House Speakers, David H. Wilkins and Robert J. Sheheen.

Early career 
Del Priore's artistic talents were evident in his childhood. After graduating from Columbia High School in 1972, he got a job locally as an advertising artist with J.B. White's department store, producing art for The State newspaper, and doing freelance art for local businesses. He befriended established portrait artist Gian Cassone after observing him painting exceptional portraits in a booth at Richland Mall. Cassone, who had studied at the Art Institute of Chicago and the Accademia di Belle Arti in Florence, Italy, saw Del Priore's raw talent but noted his lack of experience and told him, "Go home and draw a thousand heads, then I'll teach you what you need to know." Del Priore completed the huge task, returning in just six weeks. Cassone never expected to see him again, but true to his word, he introduced Del Priore to master techniques of portrait painting in oil and pastel. Under Cassone's tutelage, he completed hundreds of portraits during a 5-year stint at the mall location. In 1979, Del Priore was commissioned to paint his first nationally known, publicly-elected official when Congressman William Jennings Bryan Dorn asked him to do his portrait for permanent display in the lobby of the new Dorn VA Hospital in Columbia, named in his honor.

In 1980, on Cassone's recommendation, Del Priore moved to Charleston, SC, to study oil painting under renowned artist Ray Goodbred at the Gibbes Museum of Art. Goodbred, who had studied at the Art Students League under Ogden Pleissner and Robert Brackman, maintained dual residences in New York and Charleston at the time. Goodbred taught him master skills including palette organization, anatomy basics and manipulation of brushes by painting from live models and doing still life studies.

After returning to Columbia in 1984, Del Priore entered a competition announced in The State newspaper for artists to do an official oil portrait of former governor, U. S. Senator Strom Thurmond for the Senate Chamber of the South Carolina Statehouse, honoring his 50th year of public service. Over 200 artists responded. The selection narrowed to two, Del Priore and famed portraitist, Robert Bruce Williams of Washington, DC. "In this case, being a South Carolinian worked to my advantage," said Del Priore. "Because Senator Thurmond was famous for supporting constituents from his home state, he chose me. Afterward, the positive response I received from the public helped me move from the mall to a studio, as I no longer had to search for commissions. It was a great blessing and a major milestone in my career."

Del Priore established professional relationships with America's leading portrait artists, studying with John Howard Sanden, the late Daniel Greene, Richard Whitney, the late Nelson Shanks, the late Everett Raymond Kinstler, and many others. Throughout his career, he lectured and gave portrait demonstrations at the University of South Carolina, the Columbia Museum of Art; The Metropolitan Museum of Art, and the Art Students League of New York; the Academy of Art University in San Francisco and the Palette and Chisel Academy of Fine Art in Chicago.

Gallery

Honors 
Del Priore was past chairman and served on the board of directors of the American Society of Portrait Artists (now known as the Portrait Society of America). He was a member of the Artists Fellowship Society of New York and is listed in the Who's Who of American Artists. He served as Executive Director of the Palmetto Area Cultural Arts Center in Williamston, SC.
In 2018, South Carolina Governor Henry McMaster presented him the Order of the Palmetto, the highest honor given by the governor in recognition of his lifetime achievements in the arts.

References

External links
 

1954 births
Living people
American portrait painters
20th-century American painters
21st-century American painters
21st-century American male artists
People from Columbia, South Carolina
Painters from South Carolina
American male painters
20th-century American male artists